Durbin is an unincorporated community in Hamilton County, Indiana, in the United States.

History
Durbin was laid out in 1888. A post office was established at Durbin in 1890, and remained in operation until it was discontinued in 1905.

References

Unincorporated communities in Hamilton County, Indiana
Unincorporated communities in Indiana